William Joseph McDonough (April 21, 1934 – January 22, 2018) was a former  vice chairman and special advisor to the chairman at Merrill Lynch & Co. Inc., responsible for assisting senior management in the company's business development efforts with governments and financial institutions. He retired in 2009.

Early life and education
McDonough earned a Master of Economics degree  from Georgetown University in Washington, D.C., and a Bachelor of Economics degree from the College of the Holy Cross in Worcester, Massachusetts. He also served as an advisory board member for the Yale School of Management.

Career
Before his career with the First Chicago, McDonough was with the U.S. Navy from 1956 to 1961 and the U.S. State Department from 1961 to 1967. McDonough retired from First Chicago Corporation and its bank, First National Bank of Chicago, in 1989 after a 22-year career there. He was vice chairman of the board and a director of the corporation from 1986 until his retirement. Before joining the Federal Reserve Bank of New York, McDonough served as an advisor to a variety of domestic and international organizations.

McDonough joined the Federal Reserve Bank of New York in 1992 as executive vice president, head of the bank's markets group and manager of the Federal Open Market Committee‘s (FOMC) open market operations. He served as president and chief executive officer from July 1993 to July 2003. As president, he served as the vice chairman and a permanent member of the FOMC, which formulates U.S. monetary policy. McDonough also served on the board of directors of the Bank for International Settlements and as chairman of the Basel Committee on Banking Supervision.

From 2003 to 2005, he was chairman of the Public Company Accounting Oversight Board, a private-sector, not-for-profit corporation created by the Sarbanes-Oxley Act of 2002 to oversee auditors of public companies.

McDonough is a former member of the board of directors of the New York Philharmonic Orchestra. He is chairman of the Investment Committee for the United Nations Joint Staff Pension Fund, and is co-chairman of the United Nations Association of the United States of America (UNA-USA). He is also an Emeritus member of the Group of Thirty, an influential Washington-based financial advisory body, and has been a director of the Council on Foreign Relations since 1995.

Personal life
McDonough resided in Westchester County, New York, with his wife, Suzanne Clarke McDonough since 2005. He died January 22, 2018, at his home in Waccabuc, New York.

References

External links
Biography at the Federal Reserve Bank of New York

1934 births
2018 deaths
College of the Holy Cross alumni
Federal Reserve Bank of New York presidents
Georgetown University alumni
Merrill (company) people
People from Chicago